Helmut Trettwer (born 29 September 1983) is a German racing cyclist, who currently rides for UCI Continental team .

References

External links

1983 births
Living people
German male cyclists
Place of birth missing (living people)